Robert O. Beers (February 29, 1916 – October 8, 2005) was a member of the Pennsylvania State Senate, serving from 1963 to 1970.

References

Republican Party Pennsylvania state senators
1916 births
2005 deaths
20th-century American politicians